Bhopal BRTS is a bus rapid transit system in Bhopal, located in the state of Madhya Pradesh. The construction is funded by the Central Government under its flagship JnNURM. Unlike most of BRT projects in India which are designed to cater the transportation needs of suburban parts of the city, Bhopal BRTS is designed mainly to serve the Central business districts (CBDs). It started its operation with a fleet of just 30 buses in 2006, after receiving JnNURM Sanction, has grown to 225 buses comprising AC and Non AC Low Floor Buses.

Routes

Route Classification 
The routes under this project have been classified into the following four categories:

 Trunk Routes:
Connect major activity centers by Bus Rapid Transit System. Farthest Activity center should be accessible within 45 minutes
of journey time.

 Standard Routes:
Connect major origin & destination pairs of the city. These are replacement of Mini bus routes.

 Complimentary Routes:
These are complementary to Trunk and standard routes. Routes covering less dense Public transit demand corridors.

 Intermediate Para Transit (IPT) Routes:
These are feeder service to all above mentioned routes, mainly catering intra-zonal trips.

Route List

Bus Stops 
80 Bus Stops are being built along the 24 km long corridor. Ramp-building for most of the Stops is underway and Bhopal Municipal Corporation is likely to complete the work by June, 2013. Also, one part of corridor, which runs through Misrod to RRL may start working by 31 March 2013. A trial run was conducted earlier and minor difficulties have been sorted out. These Bus-Stops will have Display-Boards with the information of incoming Buses and siting arrangements will be made for the passengers. A 2-door system will help safe ride for the passengers, where one door will open only when the Bus arrives and another door will open only if the person carries a valid ticket. The stops are being built on PPP, where the contractor will be responsible for maintenance of the Stops and in-turn will have to right to put up advertisements and earn revenue.

"Chalo" Android App 
There is full featured Android App available in Play Store for the information related to Bhopal Brts by the name Chalo. Developer of the app  already worked on the Windows version of the app and this is  available for Windows Phone and Windows 10 devices .

Problems
 The construction of the corridors is creating traffic woes at various locations.
 Commuters are found riding on the already built 'bus-only' lanes, and police fear that this situation will continue even after the project is completed.

References

Transport in Bhopal
Bus rapid transit in India
2006 establishments in Madhya Pradesh